Newton College of the Sacred Heart was a small women's liberal arts college in Newton Centre, Massachusetts.  It opened in 1946 and merged with Boston College in June 1974.

The college was highly regarded during its time, and in 1971 founded the Institute for Open Education, which later became Cambridge College.  Like many women's colleges during the 1960s and 1970s, its applications and profits were hurt by coeducation.  By the time of its closing, it was $5 million in debt.

After its closing, Boston College assumed responsibility for paying off Newton's debt and also continued the undergraduate program for Newton's students through graduation.  It began to oversee services and programs for the approximately 3,000 living alumnae of Newton.  In 1997, with the assistance of Newton's alumnae association, Boston College created the Newton College Alumnae Professorship in Western Culture.

Today, the 40-acre (162,000 m²), 15-building Newton campus is the home of the Boston College Law School, as well as dormitories for first-year Boston College students.  The campus is approximately 1.5 miles (2 km) away from the main Chestnut Hill campus of Boston College.

See also
List of current and historical women's universities and colleges in the United States

External links
Newton College of the Sacred Heart Alumnae Association
History of Boston College Expansion
Newton College Alumnae Professorship in Western Culture

Boston College
Educational institutions established in 1946
Educational institutions disestablished in 1974
Former women's universities and colleges in the United States
Buildings and structures in Newton, Massachusetts
Defunct Catholic universities and colleges in the United States
Defunct private universities and colleges in Massachusetts
Universities and colleges in Middlesex County, Massachusetts
Catholic universities and colleges in Massachusetts
1946 establishments in Massachusetts
1974 disestablishments in Massachusetts